Dexfenfluramine, marketed as dexfenfluramine hydrochloride under the name Redux, is a serotonergic anorectic drug: it reduces appetite by increasing the amount of extracellular serotonin in the brain. It is the d-enantiomer of fenfluramine and is structurally similar to amphetamine, but lacks any psychologically stimulating effects.

Dexfenfluramine was, for some years in the mid-1990s, approved by the United States Food and Drug Administration for the purposes of weight loss. However, following multiple concerns about the cardiovascular side-effects of the drug, the FDA withdrew the approval in 1997. After it was removed in the US, dexfenfluramine was also pulled out in other global markets. It was later superseded by sibutramine, which, although initially considered a safer alternative to both dexfenfluramine and fenfluramine, was likewise removed from the US market in 2010.

The drug was developed by Interneuron Pharmaceuticals, a company co-founded by Richard Wurtman, aimed at marketing discoveries by Massachusetts Institute of Technology scientists. Interneuron licensed the patent to Wyeth-Ayerst Laboratories. Although at the time of its release, some optimism prevailed that it might herald a new approach, there remained some reservations amongst neurologists, twenty-two of whom petitioned the FDA to delay approval. Their concern was based on the work of George A. Ricaurte, whose techniques and conclusions were later questioned.

See also
 Benfluorex
 Fenfluramine
 Levofenfluramine
 Norfenfluramine

References

External links
 Drug description
 Dexfenfluramine hydrochloride
 Questions and Answers about Withdrawal of Fenfluramine (Pondimin) and Dexfenfluramine (Redux)
 Frontline: Dangerous prescriptions—Interview with Leo Lutwak, M.D. in which he discuses the side effects of fenfluramine, its successor Redux, and the Fen-Phen combination

5-HT2B agonists
Antiobesity drugs
Enantiopure drugs
Serotonin receptor agonists
Serotonin releasing agents
Substituted amphetamines
Trifluoromethyl compounds
Withdrawn drugs